The men's 4 x 100 metres relay at the 2009 World Championships in Athletics took place at the Olympic Stadium in Berlin on August 21 and August 22. The two main contenders for the event were the reigning World Champions, the United States, and the reigning Olympic Champions, Jamaica. Jamaica held the world record at 37.10 (which was later rescinded), which was established at the 2008 Summer Olympics in Beijing, while the United States entered with the 2009 overall season-best 37.85.

Medalists

* Runners who participated in the heats only and received medals.

Records
Prior to the competition, the following records were as follows.

No new world or championship record was set during this competition.

Qualification standard

Schedule

Results

Heats
The first 2 of each heat (Q) plus the 2 fastest times (q) qualify.

Key:  DNF = Did not finish, DNS = Did not start, DQ = Disqualified, Q = qualification by place in heat, q = qualification by overall place, SB = Seasonal best

Final

Key:  CR = Championship record, NR = National record, SB = Seasonal best

References
General
4×100 metres relay results. IAAF. Retrieved on 2009-08-20.
Specific

4x100
Relays at the World Athletics Championships